Moji, stylized as mOȷı, previously known as O Channel, is an Indonesian free-to-air television network founded by Elang Mahkota Teknologi and MRA Media. MRA Media sold its stake in O Channel on 2007. Initially broadcasts as a local station in Jakarta, it broadcasts from 24 hours, 7 days a week.

Since 2020, Moji has increasingly established itself to broadcast nationally through digital television on SCM's multiplexing channel (SCTV or Indosiar), while increasing broadcast programs (especially sports programming) and slowly reducing home shopping programming. The channel is also available through analogue signals in cities where O Channel was available, such as in Banten and Bandung (the latter originally through Garuda Vision, another local broadcaster from 2012 until 2021).

Moji become an official broadcaster of 2022 FIFA World Cup, along with SCTV, Indosiar and Mentari TV. In early August 2022, initial signs of rebranding began to appear when a promo for Indosiar's coverage World Cup featured the branding of the new channel. On 14 August 2022, O Channel's social media accounts began sending farewell messages, further intensifying the rebrand rumours. On 20 August 2022, O Channel replaced their digital on-screen graphic with an #OCPamit countdown, with the rebranding taking effect on the midnight of 21 August.

Moji officially launched during Vidio program Meet the Champion with former English footballer Michael Owen.

Moji also become an official broadcaster of 2023 FIFA U-20 World Cup, along with SCTV, Indosiar and Mentari TV.

Programming

Non-sports 
 Today's Update
 Sport's Update
 Bisik (Berita & Info Selebritis Terkini)
 Jalan-Jalan
 Exploride
 Indonesia Food Adventure
 Indo Travelogue
 The Dream Job
 Our Makan Places
 Tastimony
 Sport Woman
 The Immortals
 Cari Cuan
 Potret
 Volley in Love
 Youphoria

Sports 
2023 FIFA U-20 World Cup (live coverage for group stage matches, delayed from round of 16 until final)
2023 AFC Asian Cup (live coverage for group stage matches, delayed from round of 16 until final)
NBA (one live game on Friday, plus NBA Finals)
Liga 1 (up to two matches per week free on analogue/digital terrestrial; with Indosiar) (2018–present)
Liga 2 (2021–present)
UEFA (2016-2024, except for the 2018–19 season; repeat and delayed matches only, as well as classic matches from 2020))
Champions League
Europa League
Europa Conference League (2 live matches per matchday, exclude final)
Super Cup
Youth League
Premier League (2013-2016, 2022-2025)
FIM JuniorGP World Championship
TVF
Brazilian Volleyball Super League
AFC Champions League (from 2023–24 season)
AFC Cup (from 2023–24 season)
ONE Championship (delayed)
British Superbike
FIVB
Nations Leagues
Club World Championships
PBVSI
Proliga (both men's and women's competitions; 2022–present)
Livoli (2019-present)
Italian Women's Volleyball League

Former Programs 
 O Pagi
 O Entertainment
 O Entertainment Pagi
 O Entertainment Malam (formerly named Loelebay)
 Titian Iman
 Pagi Cantik
 Cinta (Cerita Wanita)
 Masak Istimewa
 Bintang Pilihan
 Rumah dan Kita
 VIP (Vidio Ini Penting)
 Militer
 Loelebay
 Paranoia
 O Cinema
 O Shop (also aired on JTV and MYTV)
 Mamah & AA Beraksi (from Indosiar)
 Potret Menembus Batas (from SCTV)
 Melancong Yuk! (from SCTV)
 Nikmatnya Dunia (from SCTV)
 Top Kpop
 Pagi Jakarta
 Update Pagi
 Pemilu Indonesia (an to SCTV and MYTV)
 City Events
 Bazaar Style
 Paranormal Activity
 Music Mix
 Jakarta's Event
 Dem-O
 Rekomendasi
 East of Eden
 Contact Nokia with Sentra Ponsel
 Solusi Life
 Weekend Movie
 Tour of Duty
 Top K-Pop
 Mandarin Top Hits
 City Spotlights
 Holiday Yuukk!
 J-Popzilla
 The A Team
 A Little Princess
 Late Night Movie
 Lejel Home Shopping
 How to Make the Things
 Jakarta Spotlight
 JACO Home Shopping
 DRTV
 DKI 15
 O Cinema
 2016 Summer Olympics (with SCTV dan Indosiar)
 Asian Games 2018 (with TVRI, tvOne, Metro TV, SCTV dan Indosiar)
 Pagi Cantik
 Sahabat Inspirasi
 Golden Memories (from Indosiar)
 Stand Up Comedy Academy (from Indosiar)
 Piala Presiden 2018 (with Indosiar, selected TVRI regional stations, and CTV Network)
 2020 Summer Olympics (with TVRI and Indosiar)
 2020 Summer Paralympics
 FIFA Club World Cup (2019 third place match and 2020 full coverage)

Slogans 
As O Channel
 Jakarta's Own Channel (2004-2013)
 Your Inspiring Entertainment and Lifestyle Television (2013-2015)
 Women Inspiration and Lifestyle Television (2015-2017)
 Your Lifetainment Destination (2017-2020)
 Inspirasi Bahagia (Happy Inspiration) (2020)
 Inspirasi Semangatmu! (Inspiration of Your Spirit!) (2021)
 Home of Funtastic Sport (2021-2022)

As Moji
 Everyday Excitement (2022–present)
 It's Moji (2022–present, sub-slogan)

References

External links 
 

Companies based in Jakarta
Sports television in Indonesia
Television networks in Indonesia
Television channels and stations established in 2004
Mass media in Jakarta
Elang Mahkota Teknologi